Maranta gibba is a plant species native to Mexico (Campeche, Chiapas, Jalisco, Morelos, Oaxaca, Quintana Roo, Puebla, San Luis Potosí, Veracruz, Yucatán), Central America, northern South America (Brazil, Peru, Colombia, Venezuela, Guyana, French Guiana, Suriname), and the Island of Trinidad. It is reportedly naturalized in the Lesser Antilles.

Maranta gibba is a shrubby perennial with ovate leaves. Flowers are borne in panicles. Fruits are gibbous. Plant was originally described from specimens grown in a garden on Barbados and shipped from there to Liverpool.

References

Flora of Brazil
Flora of Trinidad and Tobago
Flora of Suriname
Flora of Guyana
Flora of Venezuela
Flora of Colombia
Flora of Peru
Flora of Central America
Flora of Mexico
Flora of the Windward Islands
Flora of the Leeward Islands
Flora of Yucatán
Flora of Veracruz
Flora of San Luis Potosí
Flora of Puebla
Flora of Oaxaca
Flora of Morelos
Flora of Jalisco
Flora of Chiapas
Flora of French Guiana
Flora of Campeche
Flora of Quintana Roo
gibba
Flora without expected TNC conservation status